Siglo XX (Spanish for "Twentieth Century") may refer to: 

 Siglo XX (band), Belgian band
 Siglo XX Cambalache, Argentine television program
 Siglo XX mine, tin mine in Bolivia